Serrita is a city  in the state of Pernambuco, Brazil. The population in 2020, according with IBGE was 19,196 inhabitants and the total area is 1535.2 km².

Geography

 State - Pernambuco
 Region - Sertão Pernambucano
 Boundaries - Ceará state    (N);  Parnamirim  and Terra Nova  (S);  Salgueiro and Cedro   (E);   Moreilândia and Granito   (W).
 Area - 1603.6 km²
 Elevation - 419 m
 Hydrography - Brigida and Terra Nova rivers
 Vegetation - Caatinga  hiperxerófila
 Climate - semi arid - (Sertão) hot
 Annual average temperature - 27.0 c
 Distance to Recife - 535.5 km

Economy

The main economic activities in Serrita are based in agribusiness, especially creation of goats, sheep, pigss, cattle, horses, donkeys, chickens;  and plantations of onions, beans and bananas.

Economic Indicators

Economy by Sector
2006

Health Indicators

References

Municipalities in Pernambuco